Alexander or Alex Holland may refer to:

 Skinnyman (Alexander Graham Holland), English rapper
 Alex Holland (footballer), Australian rules footballer
Alexander de Holand, MP for Derby (UK Parliament constituency)
Alexander Holland (MP) for Derby (UK Parliament constituency)